Edison Real Bird was the chairman of the Crow Nation Tribal Council from 1966 to 1972. While in that position, he implemented several key democratic reforms, and oversaw the election of Pauline Small, the first woman to be elected in the Crow Nation.

He was photographed at the signing of the Crow Tribal Agreement, with Stewart Udall and Arnold Olsen, in 1961.

"In 1967, during the Edison Real Bird Administration the Crow Cultural Commission, chaired by Henry Old Coyote, began a plan to design the Crow Tribal emblem and flag."

The Crow Central Education Commission of the Crow Tribe of Indians, which was authorized and funded in 1972, "during the Edison Real Bird administration," became the parent organization of today's Little Big Horn College.

The Edison Real Bird Memorial Complex in Crow Agency, Montana, named in his honor, is the site of many events that are a part of Crow Fair.

Notes and references

External links 
 Programs-Edison Real Bird Administration, 

Native American leaders
Crow tribe
Chairpersons of the Crow Nation
20th-century Native Americans
Year of birth missing
Year of death missing